Veikko Suominen (May 5, 1948 - December 21, 1978) was an ice hockey player who played in the SM-liiga for Upon Pallo, Kiekko-67 and Ilves from 1967 to 1978.

Death
Suominen committed suicide on December 21, 1978 while a member of the Tampere-based team Ilves. After his death, Ilves retired his jersey number, 24, out of use immediately and it has not been assigned since.

1948 births
1978 deaths
Ilves players
Finnish ice hockey forwards
Suicides in Finland
1978 suicides
People from Rauma, Finland
Sportspeople from Satakunta